The Taiwan Foundation for Democracy (TFD) is a non-profit organisation headquartered in Taipei. Originally initiated by the Ministry of Foreign Affairs of the Republic of China, the foundation's purpose is to promote democracy around the world. The Foundation was established in June 2003 as a non-partisan, non-profit organization.

The foundation was one of the largest donors to the Victims of Communism Memorial Foundation, donating US$1 million towards the construction of the Victims of Communism Memorial in Washington, DC.

On 9 November 2009 the TFD unveiled a segment of the Berlin Wall to remark the 20th anniversary of the fall of the Berlin Wall as a symbol for the quest for global democracy.

Organizational structure
 Secretariat
 Research and Development Department
 International Cooperation Department
 Domestic Affairs Department
 Asia-Pacific Democracy Resource Center

Programs
 World Forum for Democratization in Asia (WFDA)
 Asia Democracy and Human Rights Award

Publications 
TFD publishes the semi-annual Taiwan Journal of Democracy (TJD), a refereed journal for the study of democratic politics, especially democratic development in Taiwan and other Asian democracies.

TFD also publishes in English the annual China Human Rights Report, Taiwan Democracy Quarterly in Mandarin Chinese with an English edition due in late 2018, among other publications.

References

External links

 Taiwan Foundation for Democracy in English
 台灣民主基金會 (Táiwān Mínzhǔ jījīnhuì) in Chinese
 World Forum for Democracy in Asia
 Asia Democracy and Human Rights Award
 IHRFG: Taiwan Foundation for Democracy

2003 establishments in Taiwan
Civic and political organizations of Taiwan
Commemoration of communist crimes
Members of the Unrepresented Nations and Peoples Organization
Organizations established in 2003
Think tanks based in Taiwan
Democracy promotion